Jock Gibson (25 March 1921 – 4 December 1994) was an Australian épée, foil and sabre fencer. He competed in five events at the 1952 Summer Olympics.

References

1921 births
1994 deaths
Australian male épée fencers
Olympic fencers of Australia
Fencers at the 1952 Summer Olympics
Sportspeople from Sydney
Commonwealth Games medallists in fencing
Commonwealth Games bronze medallists for Australia
Fencers at the 1950 British Empire Games
Australian male foil fencers
Australian male sabre fencers
Medallists at the 1950 British Empire Games